First Horizon Bank, formerly First Tennessee Bank, is a financial services company, founded in 1864, and based in Memphis, Tennessee. As the leading subsidiary of First Horizon Corporation, it provides financial services through locations in 12 states across the Southeast.

In November 2019, First Horizon Corporation and Lafayette, Louisiana-based IberiaBank Corporation, the merger closing July 2, 2020. The combined bank is based in Memphis, Tennessee, and uses the First Horizon name.

History
Frank S. Davis founded First National Bank, the first nationally chartered bank in Memphis after passage of the National Banking Act of 1863. Though the city was under martial law after being captured by Union forces in the Civil War, First National Bank of Memphis was officially chartered for business on March 25, 1864., during the American Civil War.

The yellow fever epidemics in Memphis from 1867 through 1878 halted growth, killing thousands and forcing most of the remaining citizens to flee. First National Bank's doors remained open to help distribute relief funds.

The bank acquired German Bank in 1895. First National was one of five banks in the twelve districts to help implement the Federal Reserve Act of 1913. and in 1914, the bank participated in the organization of the Federal Reserve Bank of St. Louis. The bank merged with Central-State National Bank in 1926. The merged bank retained First National's name and charter, but was led by Central-State's management team. 

In 1942, the bank opened its first suburban branch and by 1952 First National had seven offices. In 1961, a 25-story tower was announced. The 23-story headquarters was completed three years later, at which time First National also opened six branches. As of 1967, First National was the largest bank in the Mid-South. A holding company, First National Holding Corporation, was created in 1969. Two years later, this became First Tennessee National Corporation, with the intention of acquiring other banks. The company acquired five banks in 1972, and as more banks became part of the company, their names changed to First Tennessee Bank. In 1977, First National also became First Tennessee Bank. 

In 1981 First Express became the first national check-clearing service, and First Tennessee offered brokerage services starting the next year.

In 1995, with the purchases of Maryland National Mortgage Corporation and SNMC Management Corporation, First Tennessee had $6 billion in mortgage origination and was one of the country's top 10 mortgage originators.

Allen B. Morgan was named president in 1960, chief executive in 1967, and chairman in 1969.

During the 1980s, the company also expanded into mortgage brokerage, mortgage loan origination, and insurance.

In 1993, the bank acquired MNC Mortgage.

In 1994, the bank acquired Peoples Commercial Services Corporation.

In 1995, with the purchases of Maryland National Mortgage Corporation and SNMC Management Corporation, First Tennessee had $6 billion in mortgage origination and was one of the country's top 10 mortgage originators.

In 1999, to reflect its diversification, the bank adopted the slogan, All Things Financial.

In 2004, the company changed its name to First Horizon National Corporation to reflect its interstate growth.

In May 2007, the company acquired Republic Mortgage, based in Las Vegas.

In September 2007, the company sold 34 branches outside of Tennessee, including 13 branches to M&T Bank, 10 branches to Sterling Bank, 9 branches to Fifth Third, and 2 branches to FMCB Holdings.

In June 2008, the company sold its residential-mortgage origination and servicing business to Metlife.

In November 2008, the United States Department of the Treasury invested $866 million in the company as part of the Troubled Asset Relief Program and in December 2010, the company repurchased the investment from the Treasury.

On June 7, 2013, the bank acquired Mountain National Bank, which suffered from bank failure.

In October 2015, the company acquired TrustAtlantic Bank.

In December 2017, the company acquired Capital Bank Financial for $2.2 billion. Capital Bank later announced it would lease two floors of the 10-story One Glenwood in Raleigh. The lease included a sign on the building.

First Horizon announced on June 11, 2019, that in fall of 2019 it would have the same name in all of its markets. The change encompassing First Tennessee Bank, Capital Bank, FTB Advisors and FTN Financial became effective at the close of business on October 25, 2019, with signage changes expected to be complete throughout those holdings by early 2020. 

In November 2019, First Horizon Corporation and Lafayette, Louisiana-based IberiaBank Corporation agreed to merge. The combined bank is based in Memphis, Tennessee, and uses the First Horizon name. The merger closed July 2, 2020, with $79 billion in assets and $58 billion in loans.

On February 28, 2022, Toronto-based TD Bank Group announced that it would acquire First Horizon Corporation in an all-cash deal of $13.4 billion. TD will pay $25 per First Horizon share. The transaction is expected to be completed in February 2023 and would be the second-largest bank deal in recent U.S history.

Consumer and Business Banking
First Horizon banking services are available to individual consumers as well as businesses of all sizes.

On October 11, 2016, First Tennessee announced the opening of its first Piedmont Triad retail branch in Winston-Salem. The bank had offered commercial banking and real estate and wealth-management services in the city since 2004. From 2003 to 2016, Winston-Salem was also the headquarters of the Mid-Atlantic Region, including the Triangle, Charlotte and Greenville in North Carolina; Richmond in Virginia; Charleston in South Carolina; and Jacksonville in Florida. The new regional headquarters was in Raleigh, where First Tennessee had four branches after buying TrustAtlantic Bank in 2015.

Wealth Management
First Horizon offers wealth management services through its affiliate, First Horizon Advisors, Inc. The company’s services include guidance focused on investments, retirement, insurance, trusts, financial planning, and estate planning.

References

Announced mergers and acquisitions
Banks based in Tennessee
Companies based in Memphis, Tennessee